On the Bandstand is an album by American country music artist Buck Owens, released in 1963. It peaked at Number 2 on the Billboard Country Albums charts.

The CD re-issued in 1995 by Sundazed Records includes "Sweethearts in Heaven" and "We're the Talk of the Town", 1963 Top 20 duet single Owens recorded with Rose Maddox.

Reception

In his Allmusic review, critic Richie Unterberger wrote "One of Buck's rootsier '60s Capitol albums"

Track listing
 "Sawmill" (Mel Tillis, Horace Whatley) – 2:25
 "King of Fools" (Buck Owens, Red Simpson) – 2:34
 "Sally Was a Good Old Girl" (Harlan Howard) – 2:22
 "I Can't Stop My Lovin' You" (Owens, Don Rich) – 2:46
 "Orange Blossom Special" (Ervin Rouse) – 2:08
 "Cotton Fields" (Lead Belly) – 2:13
 "Kickin' Our Hearts Around" (Wanda Jackson) – 2:36
 "Touch Me" (Willie Nelson) – 3:08
 "Sweethearts in Heaven" (Owens) – 2:57
 "Release Me" (Eddie Miller, Dub Williams, Robert Yount) – 2:36
 "One Way Love" (Owens) – 2:26
 "Diggy Liggy Lo" (J. D. Miller) – 2:16
1995 reissue bonus tracks:
 "Sweethearts in Heaven" (Owens) – 2:51
 "We're the Talk of the Town" (Owens, Rollie Weber) – 2:06

Personnel
Buck Owens – guitar, vocals
Don Rich – guitar, fiddle, lead vocals on "Sally Was a Good Old Girl"
Ralph Mooney – pedal steel guitar
Jim Pierce – piano
Jelly Sanders – fiddle, guitar
Wayne Stone – drums
Kenny Pierce – bass, lead vocals on "Touch Me"
John Maddox – guitar
Rose Maddox – vocals
Bobby Austin – bass
George French – piano
Jay McDonald – pedal steel guitar
Ken Presley – drums

References

1963 albums
Buck Owens albums
Capitol Records albums
Albums produced by Ken Nelson (United States record producer)

Albums recorded at Capitol Studios